Jean Armand de Maillé, Duke of Fronsac, Marquis of Brézé (18 October 1619 – 14 June 1646) was a French admiral.

He was born in Milly-le-Meugon, in one of the most powerful French families of the time; his father was Urbain de Maillé, Marquis of Brézé, Marshal of France, his uncle Cardinal Richelieu, King Louis XIII's renowned minister, and his brother-in-law, Louis de Bourbon, Prince of Condé, (better known as the le Grand Condé), was the First Prince of the Blood.

Thanks to his uncle, at the age of seventeen, he received the title of grand-maître de la navigation (Grand-master of Navigation), a new title created by King Louis XIII for Cardinal Richelieu and equivalent to Grand Admiral of France.

One of the leading figures in the Eighty Years' War, he defeated the Spanish fleet near Cadiz (20 July 1640), and then seized Villafranca. In 1641, he arrived in Portugal to help in the Portuguese Restoration War against Spain. In 1642, he fought an indecisive action against the Spanish forces near Barcelona, and nearly completely destroyed their fleet near Cartagena on 3 July 1643. He was killed on 16 June 1646, during the Battle of Orbetello, where his fleet was defeated.

His remains were buried in the church of Milly le Meugon, abutted to the castle walls.

Honours 

Three ships were named in his honour: see French ship Maillé Brézé

46-gun ship of the line Brézé (1646-1665) [1]
Maillé-Brézé (named Brézé until January 1931), a Vauquelin class destroyer destroyed in the accidental explosion of one of her torpedoes on 30 April 1940 in Greenock, Scotland
Maillé-Brézé (D627), T 47 class destroyer, presently a museum

Sources
Les bâtiments ayant porté le nom de Maillé-Brézé
Find a Grave

 , vol. 26
 La Bruyère, René, La marine de Richelieu; Maillé-Brézé, général des galères, grand amiral (1619-1646), Plon, Paris, 1945, 245 pages.

1619 births
1646 deaths
People from Maine-et-Loire
French Navy admirals
Dukes of Fronsac
17th-century peers of France
Military personnel of the Franco-Spanish War (1635–1659)